Be'er Tuvia Regional Council (Mo'atza Azorit Be'er Tovia), is a regional council in the southern Coastal Plain region in Israel.

It borders Yoav and Nahal Sorek regional councils in the east; Hof Ashkelon regional council, the Mediterranean Sea, the city of Ashdod and Gan Yavne local council in the west; Gederot, Hevel Yavne regional councils and Gedera, Bnei Aish local councils in the north; Shafir regional council in the south. The town of Kiryat Malakhi is enclaved in the middle.

Be'er Tuvia was incorporated as a regional council in 1950, with a land-area of approximately 140,000 dunams (140 km²). According to the Israel Central Bureau of Statistics, the regional council had a population of 18,600.

Economy
Initially all settlements in the area were built as agricultural. There are lot of plantations and crop fields can be seen. Farms producing beef and milk are also developed. The Buffalo Ranch in Bitzaron is very famous.

Yet, over the years the local government developed industry on the lands that belongs to the regional council.

Today there are four industry zones:
 Kannot industry zone - located on junction between Highway 40 and Highway 41. It became an important logistic center and site of several function halls.
 Be'er Tuvia industry zone - located near Kiryat Malakhi on junction between Highway 3 and Highway 40. It contains numerous factories and workshops.
 Ad Halom industry zone - located on Highway 4 south of Ashdod. Some of its factories cause air pollution  in Ashdod. The municipality of Ashdod wants to take control over the zone, since it stands near  - location of an ancient Philistine city of Ashdod.
 Mivza - Re'em industrial zone - a small industry area south of Bnei Aish.

Hatzor Airbase of the Israeli Air Force is located in the council's territory.

List of settlements
There are 23 communities including nineteen moshavim, one kibbutz, one community settlement, a youth village and a service centre.

Ahva
Arugot
Avigdor
Azrikam
Be'er Tuvia
Beit Ezra
Bitzaron
Ezer

Emunim
Giv'ati
Hatzav
Hatzor
Kannot
Kfar Ahim
Kfar Warburg
Neve Mivtah (1950)

Nir Banim
Orot
Sde Uziyahu
Shtulim
Talmei Yehiel
Timorim
Yinon

External links
Official website 

 
Regional councils in Israel
1950 establishments in Israel